Mark O'Halloran may refer to:

Mark O'Halloran (rugby league) (born 1981), Australian rugby league footballer
Mark O'Halloran (writer), Irish scriptwriter and actor